The Forger is a 2014 American thriller crime drama film directed by Philip Martin and starring John Travolta. It started filming in October 2013. It was released to theaters on April 24, 2015.

Premise
Raymond Cutter, a second-generation criminal, cuts a deal with an underworld art dealer to get released early from prison to spend time with his son who has an inoperable brain tumor. He must forge a copy of Monet's Woman with a Parasol - Madame Monet and Her Son (in the National Gallery of Art, Washington, D.C.) and switch it with the real one, with the help of his son and father, to repay the syndicate that arranged his release.

Cast
John Travolta as Raymond J. Cutter
Christopher Plummer as Joseph Cutter
Abigail Spencer as Agent Paisley
Jennifer Ehle as Kim Cutter
Tye Sheridan as Will Cutter
Anson Mount as Keegan
Victor Gojcaj as Dimitri

Release and reception

Distribution
The Forger premiered at the Toronto International Film Festival on September 12, 2014. Two days before the premiere, 'Saban Films' acquired the U.S. distribution rights for over $2 million.

Critical response
The Forger received mostly negative reviews. On Rotten Tomatoes, the film holds a 9% rating, with an average score of 4.2/10, based on 44 reviews. The consensus reads: "So rote that its star is overshadowed by his wig, The Forger offers nary a thrill nor a scintilla of suspense that couldn't be overpowered by a decent basic-cable drama." On Metacritic, the film has a score of 32 out of 100, indicating "generally unfavorable reviews", based on 16 reviews from critics. IGN awarded it a score of 4.5 out of 10, saying "The Forger, starring John Travolta, goes through the motions, but isn't the real deal."

References

External links
 
 

2014 films
2010s heist films
2014 crime thriller films
2014 crime drama films
American crime drama films
American crime thriller films
American heist films
Films set in museums
Saban Films films
Films directed by Philip Martin (director)
2010s English-language films
2010s American films